Galuzi-ye Davud (also Romanized as Galūzī-ye Dāvūd; also known as Dārābī and Dārrābī) is a village in Direh Rural District, in the Central District of Gilan-e Gharb County, Kermanshah Province, Iran. At the 2006 census, its population was 31, in 7 families.

References 

Populated places in Gilan-e Gharb County